The rupee was the currency of Britain's East African colonies and protectorates between 1906 and 1920. It was divided into 100 cents.

The rupee replaced the Indian rupee, which had previously circulated. In 1920, the rupee was revalued against sterling to a peg of 1 rupee = 2 shillings (1 florin). In East Africa, this was followed in the same year by the replacement of the rupee with the East African florin at par and then in 1921 by the East African shilling at 2 shillings per florin or rupee.

The currency is noteworthy for including the world's first aluminium coin, the 1907 1 cent coin.

Coins

Silver coins were introduced for 25 and 50 cents in 1906, followed by the aluminium 1 cent and cupro-nickel 10 cent coins in 1907, the aluminium  cent coin in 1908 and the cupro-nickel 5 cent coin in 1913. Cupro-nickel replaced aluminium in 1909.

Banknotes

In 1906, notes (the first dated 1905) were introduced by the government of the East Africa Protectorate in denominations of 5, 10, 20, 40, 100 and 500 rupees. In 1920, the East African Currency Board issued 1 rupee notes shortly before the rupee was replaced.

References

Global Financial Data currency histories table
Tables of modern monetary history: Kenya
Tables of modern monetary history: Tanzania
Tables of modern monetary history: Uganda

Modern obsolete currencies
Currencies of Africa
Currencies of the British Empire
Currencies of Kenya
Currencies of Tanzania
Currencies of Uganda
East Africa
1906 establishments in the British Empire
1920 disestablishments in the British Empire
20th century in Africa